John Guice (born October 10, 1983) is a former Canadian football defensive back. He was signed by the BC Lions as a street free agent in 2008. He played college football for the UNLV Rebels.

External links
BC Lions bio
UNLV Rebels bio

1983 births
Living people
Players of Canadian football from Atlanta
Canadian football defensive backs
UNLV Rebels football players
BC Lions players